The 2013 Texas Rangers season was the Rangers' 53rd season of the franchise and the 42nd since the team relocated to Arlington, Texas. The Rangers lost a tie-breaking 163rd game against the Tampa Bay Rays on September 30, 2013, and were eliminated from playoff contention for the first time since 2009.

Season standings

American League West

American League Wild Card

The 2013 Rangers are to date the winningest team not to make the postseason in the expanded Wild Card era.

Record vs. opponents

Game log 

|- style="text-align:center; style="background-color:#fbb;"
| 1 || March 31 || @ Astros || 2–8 || Bud Norris (1–0) || Matt Harrison (0-1) || Érik Bédard (1) || 0–1
|-

|- style="text-align:center; style="background-color:#bfb;"
| 2 || April 2 || @ Astros || 7–0 || Yu Darvish (1–0) || Lucas Harrell (0–1) || None || 1–1
|- style="text-align:center; style="background-color:#bfb;"
| 3 || April 3 || @ Astros || 4–0 || Alexi Ogando (1–0) || Philip Humber (0–1) || None || 2–1
|- style="text-align:center; style="background-color:#bfb;"
| 4 || April 5 || Angels || 3–2 || Tanner Scheppers (1–0) || Scott Downs (0–2) || Joe Nathan (1) || 3–1
|- style="text-align:center; style="background-color:#fbb;"
| 5 || April 6 || Angels || 4–8 || Tommy Hanson (1–0) || Matt Harrison (0–2) || None || 3–2
|- style="text-align:center; style="background-color:#bfb;"
| 6 || April 7 || Angels || 7–3 || Yu Darvish (2–0) || Jered Weaver (0–1) || None || 4–2
|- style="text-align:center; style="background-color:#bfb;"
| 7 || April 8 || Rays || 5–4 || Alexi Ogando (2–0) || Jeremy Hellickson (0–1)|| Joe Nathan (2) || 5–2
|- style="text-align:center; style="background-color:#bfb;"
| 8 || April 9 || Rays || 6–1 || Nick Tepesch (1–0) || Roberto Hernández (0–2) || None || 6–2
|- style="text-align:center; style="background-color:#fbb;"
| 9 || April 10 || Rays || 0–2 || Matt Moore (2–0) || Derek Holland (0–1) || Fernando Rodney (1) || 6–3
|- style="text-align:center; style="background-color:#bfb;"
| 10 || April 11 || @ Mariners || 4–3 || Joseph Ortiz (1–0) || Félix Hernández (1–2) || Joe Nathan (3) || 7–3
|- style="text-align:center; style="background-color:#fbb;"
| 11 || April 12 || @ Mariners || 1–3 || Hisashi Iwakuma (2–0) || Yu Darvish (2–1) || Tom Wilhelmsen (4) || 7–4
|- style="text-align:center; style="background-color:#bfb;"
| 12 || April 13 || @ Mariners || 3–1 || Joseph Ortiz (2–0) || Carter Capps (0–1) || Joe Nathan (4) || 8–4
|- style="text-align:center; style="background-color:#fbb;"
| 13 || April 14 || @ Mariners || 3–4 || Brandon Maurer (1–2) || Nick Tepesch (1–1) || Tom Wilhelmsen (5) || 8–5
|- style="text-align:center; style="background-color:#bfb;"
| 14 || April 16 || @ Cubs || 4–2 || Derek Holland (1–1) || Travis Wood (1–1) || Joe Nathan (5) || 9–5
|- style="text-align:center; style="background-color:#bbb;"
| – || April 17 || @ Cubs || colspan=6 | Postponed (rain); Makeup: May 6
|- style="text-align:center; style="background-color:#fbb;"
| 15 || April 18 || @ Cubs ||2–6 || Carlos Villanueva (1–0) || Alexi Ogando (2–1) || None || 9–6
|- style="text-align:center; style="background-color:#bfb;"
| 16 || April 19 || Mariners || 7–0 || Yu Darvish (3–1) || Joe Saunders (1–2) || None || 10–6
|- style="text-align:center; style="background-color:#bfb;"
| 17 || April 20 || Mariners || 5–0 || Derek Lowe (1–0) || Brandon Maurer (1–3) || None || 11–6
|- style="text-align:center; style="background-color:#bfb;"
| 18 || April 21 || Mariners || 11–3 || Justin Grimm (1–0) || Aaron Harang (0–2) || Michael Kirkman (1) || 12–6
|- style="text-align:center; style="background-color:#bfb;"
| 19 || April 22 || @ Angels || 7–6 || Tanner Scheppers (2–0) || Ernesto Frieri (0–1) || Joe Nathan (6) || 13–6
|- style="text-align:center; style="background-color:#fbb;"
| 20 || April 23 || @ Angels || 4–5 (11) || Dane De La Rosa (1–0) || Joseph Ortiz (2–1) || None || 13–7
|- style="text-align:center; style="background-color:#bfb;"
| 21 || April 24 || @ Angels || 11–3 || Yu Darvish (4–1) || Michael Roth (1–1) || None || 14–7
|- style="text-align:center; style="background-color:#bfb;"
| 22 || April 25 || @ Twins || 2–1 || Nick Tepesch (2–1) || Vance Worley (0–3) || Joe Nathan (7) || 15–7
|- style="text-align:center; style="background-color:#bfb;"
| 23 || April 26 || @ Twins || 4–3 || Justin Grimm (2–0) || Scott Diamond (1–2) || Joe Nathan (8) || 16–7
|- style="text-align:center; style="background-color:#fbb;"
| 24 || April 27 || @ Twins || 2–7 || Pedro Hernández (1–0) || Derek Holland (1–2) || None || 16–8
|- style="text-align:center; style="background-color:#fbb;"
| 25 || April 28 || @ Twins || 0–5 || Kevin Correia (3–1) || Alexi Ogando (2–2) || None || 16–9
|- style="text-align:center; style="background-color:#bfb;"
| 26 || April 30 || White Sox || 10–6 || Yu Darvish (5–1) || Matt Lindstrom (1–2) || None || 17–9
|-

|- style="text-align:center; style="background-color:#fbb;"
| 27 || May 1 || White Sox || 2–5 || Chris Sale (3–2) || Nick Tepesch (2–2) || Addison Reed (9) || 17–10
|- style="text-align:center; style="background-color:#fbb;"
| 28 || May 2 || White Sox || 1–3 || Hector Santiago (1–1) || Justin Grimm (2–1) || Addison Reed (10) || 17–11
|- style="text-align:center; style="background-color:#bfb;"
| 29 || May 3 || Red Sox || 7–0 || Derek Holland (2–2) || Félix Doubront (3–1) || None || 18–11
|- style="text-align:center; style="background-color:#bfb;"
| 30 || May 4 || Red Sox || 5–1 || Alexi Ogando (3–2) || John Lackey (1–2) || None || 19–11
|- style="text-align:center; style="background-color:#bfb;"
| 31 || May 5 || Red Sox || 4–3 || Joe Nathan (1–0) || Clayton Mortensen (0–2) || None || 20–11
|- style="text-align:center; style="background-color:#fbb;"
| 32 || May 6 || @ Cubs || 2–9 || Scott Feldman (3–3) || Nick Tepesch (2–3) || None || 20–12
|- style="text-align:center; style="background-color:#fbb;"
| 33 || May 7 || @ Brewers || 3–6 || Wily Peralta (3–2) || Justin Grimm (2–2) || Jim Henderson (7) || 20–13
|- style="text-align:center; style="background-color:#bfb;"
| 34 || May 8 || @ Brewers || 4–1 || Derek Holland (3–2) || Kyle Lohse (1–4) || Joe Nathan (9) || 21–13
|- style="text-align:center; style="background-color:#bfb;"
| 35 || May 10 || @ Astros || 4–2 || Robbie Ross (1–0) || Wesley Wright (0–1) || Joe Nathan (10) || 22–13
|- style="text-align:center; style="background-color:#bfb;"
| 36 || May 11 || @ Astros || 8–7 || Yu Darvish (6–1) || Philip Humber (0–8) || Joe Nathan (11) || 23–13
|- style="text-align:center; style="background-color:#bfb;"
| 37 || May 12 || @ Astros || 12–7 || Nick Tepesch (3–3) || Jordan Lyles (1–1) || None || 24–13
|- style="text-align:center; style="background-color:#fbb;"
| 38 || May 13 || @ Athletics || 5–1 || A. J. Griffin (4–3) || Justin Grimm (2–3) || None || 24–14
|- style="text-align:center; style="background-color:#bfb;"
| 39 || May 14 || @ Athletics || 6–5 (10) || Tanner Scheppers (3–0) || Chris Resop (1–1) || Joe Nathan (12) || 25–14
|- style="text-align:center; style="background-color:#bfb;"
| 40 || May 15 || @ Athletics || 6–2 || Alexi Ogando (4–2) || Dan Straily (1–2) || None || 26–14
|- style="text-align:center; style="background-color:#bfb;"
| 41 || May 16 || Tigers || 10–4 || Yu Darvish (7–1) || Justin Verlander (4–4) || None || 27–14
|- style="text-align:center; style="background-color:#fbb;"
| 42 || May 17 || Tigers || 1–2 || Rick Porcello (2–2) || Nick Tepesch (3–4) || José Valverde (4) || 27–15
|- style="text-align:center; style="background-color:#bfb;"
| 43 || May 18 || Tigers || 7–2 || Justin Grimm (3–3) || Aníbal Sánchez (4–4) || None || 28–15
|- style="text-align:center; style="background-color:#bfb;"
| 44 || May 19 || Tigers || 11–8 || Robbie Ross (2–0) || José Ortega (0–1) || Joe Nathan (13) || 29-15
|- style="text-align:center; style="background-color:#fbb;"
| 45 || May 20 || Athletics || 2–9 || Bartolo Colón (4–2) || Josh Lindblom (0–1) || None || 29–16
|- style="text-align:center; style="background-color:#fbb;"
| 46 || May 21 || Athletics || 0–1 || Dan Straily (2–2) || Yu Darvish (7–2) || Grant Balfour (9) || 29–17
|- style="text-align:center; style="background-color:#bfb;"
| 47 || May 22 || Athletics || 3–1 || Ross Wolf (1–0) || Jarrod Parker (2–6) || Joe Nathan (14) || 30–17
|- style="text-align:center; style="background-color:#bfb;"
| 48 || May 24 || @ Mariners || 9–5 || Justin Grimm (4–3) || Joe Saunders (3–5) || Joe Nathan (15) || 31–17
|- style="text-align:center; style="background-color:#bfb;"
| 49 || May 25 || @ Mariners || 5–2 || Derek Holland (4–2) || Félix Hernández (5–4) || Joe Nathan (16) || 32–17
|- style="text-align:center; style="background-color:#fbb;"
| 50 || May 26 || @ Mariners || 3–4 (13) || Yoervis Medina (1–0) || Michael Kirkman (0–1) || None || 32–18
|- style="text-align:center; style="background-color:#fbb;"
| 51 || May 27 (1) || @ Diamondbacks || 3–5 || Tyler Skaggs (1–0) || Martín Pérez (0–1) || Heath Bell (9) || 32–19
|- style="text-align:center; style="background-color:#fbb;"
| 52 || May 27 (2) || @ Diamondbacks || 4–5 || Brad Ziegler (2–1) || Jason Frasor (0–1) || None || 32–20
|- style="text-align:center; style="background-color:#bbb"
| – || May 29 || Diamondbacks || colspan=6 | Postponed (rain); Makeup: August 1
|- style="text-align:center; style="background-color:#bfb"
| 53 || May 30 || Diamondbacks || 9–5 || Justin Grimm (5–3) || Brandon McCarthy (2–4) || None || 33–20
|- style="text-align:center; style="background-color:#bfb"
| 54 || May 31 || Royals || 7–2 || Derek Holland (5–2) || Wade Davis (3–5) || None || 34–20
|-

|- style="text-align:center; style="background-color:#fbb"
| 55 || June 1 || Royals || 1–4 (10) || Aaron Crow (1–1) || Robbie Ross (2–1) || Greg Holland (9) || 34–21
|- style="text-align:center; style="background-color:#bfb"
| 56 || June 2 || Royals || 3–1 || Tanner Scheppers (4–0) || J. C. Gutiérrez (0–1) || Joe Nathan (17) || 35–21
|- style="text-align:center; style="background-color:#fbb"
| 57 || June 4 || @ Red Sox || 5–17 || Ryan Dempster (3–6) || Justin Grimm (5–4) || None || 35–22
|- style="text-align:center; style="background-color:#bfb"
| 58 || June 5 || @ Red Sox || 3–2 || Neal Cotts (1–0) || Craig Breslow (2–1) || Joe Nathan (18) || 36–22
|- style="text-align:center; style="background-color:#fbb"
| 59 || June 6 || @ Red Sox || 3–6 || Andrew Bailey (2–0) || Michael Kirkman (0–2) || None || 36–23
|- style="text-align:center; style="background-color:#fbb"
| 60 || June 7 || @ Blue Jays || 1–6 || Neil Wagner (1–0) || Nick Tepesch (3–5) || None || 36–24
|- style="text-align:center; style="background-color:#fbb"
| 61 || June 8 || @ Blue Jays || 3–4 (18) || Aaron Loup (3–3) || Ross Wolf (1–1) || None || 36–25
|- style="text-align:center; style="background-color:#bfb"
| 62 || June 9 || @ Blue Jays || 6–4 || Neal Cotts (2–0) || Neil Wagner (1–1) || Joe Nathan (19) || 37–25
|- style="text-align:center; style="background-color:#bfb"
| 63 || June 10 || Indians || 6–3 || Robbie Ross (3–1) || Scott Kazmir (3–4) || Joe Nathan (20) || 38–25
|- style="text-align:center; style="background-color:#fbb"
| 64 || June 11 || Indians || 2–5 || Corey Kluber (4–4) || Derek Holland (5–3) || None || 38–26
|- style="text-align:center; style="background-color:#fbb"
| 65 || June 12 || Indians || 2–5 || Ubaldo Jiménez (5–4) || Nick Tepesch (3–6) || None || 38–27
|- style="text-align:center; style="background-color:#fbb"
| 66 || June 13 || Blue Jays || 1–3 || Esmil Rogers (2–2) || Neal Cotts (2–1) || Casey Janssen (14) || 38–28
|- style="text-align:center; style="background-color:#fbb"
| 67 || June 14 || Blue Jays || 0–8 || Mark Buehrle (3–4) || Justin Grimm (5–5) || None || 38–29
|- style="text-align:center; style="background-color:#fbb"
| 68 || June 15 || Blue Jays || 1–6 || R. A. Dickey (6–8) || Josh Lindblom (0–2) || None || 38–30
|- style="text-align:center; style="background-color:#fbb"
| 69 || June 16 || Blue Jays || 2–7 || Chien-Ming Wang (1–0) || Derek Holland (5–4) || None || 38–31
|- style="text-align:center; style="background-color:#bfb"
| 70 || June 17 || Athletics || 8–7 || Neal Cotts (3–1) || Jesse Chavez (1–1) || Joe Nathan (21) || 39–31
|- style="text-align:center; style="background-color:#fbb"
| 71 || June 18 || Athletics || 2–6 || Jarrod Parker (6–6) || Yu Darvish (7–3) || None || 39–32
|- style="text-align:center; style="background-color:#bfb"
| 72 || June 19 || Athletics || 9–4 || Justin Grimm (6–5) || Tommy Milone (6–7) || None || 40–32
|- style="text-align:center; style="background-color:#bfb"
| 73 || June 20 || Athletics || 4–3 || Tanner Scheppers (5–0) || Sean Doolittle (3–2) || Joe Nathan (22) || 41–32
|- style="text-align:center; style="background-color:#bfb"
| 74 || June 21 || @ Cardinals || 6–4 || Neal Cotts (4–1) || Trevor Rosenthal (1–1) || Joe Nathan (23) || 42–32
|- style="text-align:center; style="background-color:#bfb"
| 75 || June 22 || @ Cardinals || 4–2 || Martín Pérez (1–1) || Shelby Miller (8–5) || Joe Nathan (24) || 43–32
|- style="text-align:center; style="background-color:#bfb"
| 76 || June 23 || @ Cardinals || 2–1 || Robbie Ross (4–1) || Adam Wainwright (10–5) || Joe Nathan (25) || 44–32
|- style="text-align:center; style="background-color:#fbb"
| 77 || June 25 || @ Yankees || 3–4 || Mariano Rivera (1–1) || Tanner Scheppers (5–1) || None || 44–33
|- style="text-align:center; style="background-color:#bfb"
| 78 || June 26 || @ Yankees || 8–5 || Justin Grimm (7–5) || Andy Pettitte (5–6) || Joe Nathan (26) || 45–33
|- style="text-align:center; style="background-color:#bfb"
| 79 || June 27 || @ Yankees || 2–0 || Derek Holland (6–4) || Phil Hughes (3–7) || None || 46–33
|- style="text-align:center; style="background-color:#bfb"
| 80 || June 28 || Reds || 4–0 || Martín Pérez (2–1) || Johnny Cueto (4–2) || None || 47–33
|- style="text-align:center; style="background-color:#fbb"
| 81 || June 29 || Reds || 4–6 (11) || J. J. Hoover (1–5) || Kyle McClellan (0–1) || Aroldis Chapman (20) || 47–34
|- style="text-align:center; style="background-color:#bfb"
| 82 || June 30 || Reds || 3–2 || Yu Darvish (8–3) || Mat Latos (7–2) || Joe Nathan (27) || 48–34
|-

|- style="text-align:center; style="background-color:#fbb"
| 83 || July 2 || Mariners || 2–9 || Joe Saunders (6–8) || Justin Grimm (7–6) || None || 48–35
|- style="text-align:center; style="background-color:#fbb"
| 84 || July 3 || Mariners || 2–4 (10) || Charlie Furbush (2–4) || Robbie Ross (4–2) || Tom Wilhelmsen (17) || 48–36
|- style="text-align:center; style="background-color:#bfb"
| 85 || July 4 || Mariners || 5–4 || Josh Lindblom (1–2) || Hisashi Iwakuma (7–4) || Joe Nathan (28) || 49–36
|- style="text-align:center; style="background-color:#bfb"
| 86 || July 5 || Astros || 10–5 || Nick Tepesch (4–6) || Lucas Harrell (5–9) || None || 50–36
|- style="text-align:center; style="background-color:#fbb"
| 87 || July 6 || Astros || 5–9 || Travis Blackley (1–0) || Yu Darvish (8–4) || None || 50–37
|- style="text-align:center; style="background-color:#bfb"
| 88 || July 7 || Astros || 5–4 || Cory Burns (1–0) || Érik Bédard (3–5) || Joe Nathan (29) || 51–37
|- style="text-align:center; style="background-color:#bfb"
| 89 || July 8 || @ Orioles || 8–5 || Derek Holland (7–4) || Scott Feldman (7–7) || Joe Nathan (30) || 52–37
|- style="text-align:center; style="background-color:#bfb"
| 90 || July 9 || @ Orioles || 8–4 || Martín Pérez (3–1) || Zach Britton (2–3) || None || 53–37
|- style="text-align:center; style="background-color:#fbb"
| 91 || July 10 || @ Orioles || 1–6 || Wei-Yin Chen (4–3) || Josh Lindblom (1–3) || None || 53–38
|- style="text-align:center; style="background-color:#fbb"
| 92 || July 11 || @ Orioles || 1–3 || Miguel González (7–3) || Ross Wolf (1–2)|| Jim Johnson (31) || 53–39
|- style="text-align:center; style="background-color:#fbb"
| 93 || July 12 || @ Tigers || 2–7 || Doug Fister (7–5) || Justin Grimm (7–7) || None || 53–40
|- style="text-align:center; style="background-color:#bfb"
| 94 || July 13 || @ Tigers || 7–1 || Derek Holland (8–4) || Max Scherzer (13–1) || None || 54–40
|- style="text-align:center; style="background-color:#fbb"
| 95 || July 14 || @ Tigers || 0–5 || Justin Verlander (10–6) || Martín Pérez (3–2) || None || 54–41
|- style="text-align:center; style="background-color:#bbcaff"
| – || July 16 ||colspan="7" |All-Star Break: AL defeats NL 3–0
|- style="text-align:center; style="background-color:#fbb"
| 96 || July 19 || Orioles || 1–3 || Wei-Yin Chen (5–3) || Derek Holland (8–5) || Jim Johnson (34) || 54–42
|- style="text-align:center; style="background-color:#fbb"
| 97 || July 20 || Orioles || 4–7 || Miguel González (8–3) || Ross Wolf (1–3) || Jim Johnson (35) || 54–43
|- style="text-align:center; style="background-color:#fbb"
| 98 || July 21 || Orioles || 2–4 || Chris Tillman (12–3) || Martín Pérez (3–3) || Darren O'Day (2) || 54–44
|- style="text-align:center; style="background-color:#bfb"
| 99 || July 22 || Yankees || 3–0 || Yu Darvish (9–4) || Iván Nova (4–3) || Joe Nathan (31) || 55–44
|- style="text-align:center; style="background-color:#fbb"
| 100 || July 23 || Yankees || 4–5 || Joba Chamberlain (2–0) || Joe Nathan (1–1) || Mariano Rivera (32) || 55–45
|- style="text-align:center; style="background-color:#bfb"
| 101 || July 24 || Yankees || 3–1 || Matt Garza (7–1) || Andy Pettitte (7–8) || Joe Nathan (32) || 56–45
|- style="text-align:center; style="background-color:#fbb"
| 102 || July 25 || Yankees || 0–2 || Hiroki Kuroda (10–6) || Derek Holland (8–6) || Mariano Rivera (33) || 56–46
|- style="text-align:center; style="background-color:#fbb"
| 103 || July 26 || @ Indians || 8–11 (11) || Bryan Shaw (1–2) || Jason Frasor (0–2) || None || 56–47
|- style="text-align:center; style="background-color:#fbb"
| 104 || July 27 || @ Indians || 0–1 || Justin Masterson (12–7) || Yu Darvish (9–5) || Chris Perez (14)|| 56–48
|- style="text-align:center; style="background-color:#fbb"
| 105 || July 28 || @ Indians || 0–6 || Ubaldo Jiménez (8–5) || Alexi Ogando (4–3) || None || 56–49
|- style="text-align:center; style="background-color:#bfb"
| 106 || July 29 || Angels || 4–3 || Jason Frasor (1–2) || Ernesto Frieri (0–3) || None || 57–49
|- style="text-align:center; style="background-color:#bfb"
| 107 || July 30 || Angels || 14–11 (10) || Joe Nathan (2–1) || Daniel Stange (0–1) || None || 58–49
|- style="text-align:center; style="background-color:#bfb"
| 108 || July 31 || Angels || 2–1 || Joe Nathan (3–1) || Michael Kohn (1–1) || None || 59–49
|-

|- style="text-align:center; style="background-color:#bfb"
| 109 || August 1 || Diamondbacks || 7–1 || Yu Darvish (10–5) || Zeke Spruill (0–1) || None || 60–49
|- style="text-align:center; style="background-color:#bfb"
| 110 || August 2 || @ Athletics || 8–3 || Jason Frasor (2–2) || Tommy Milone (9–9) || None || 61–49
|- style="text-align:center; style="background-color:#fbb"
| 111 || August 3 || @ Athletics || 2–4 || Jarrod Parker (7–6) || Matt Garza (7–2) || Grant Balfour (29) || 61–50
|- style="text-align:center; style="background-color:#bfb"
| 112 || August 4 || @ Athletics || 4–0 || Derek Holland (9–6) || A. J. Griffin (10–8) || None || 62–50
|- style="text-align:center; style="background-color:#bfb"
| 113 || August 5 || @ Angels || 5–2 || Martín Pérez (4–3) || Jerome Williams (5–8) || Joe Nathan (33) || 63–50
|- style="text-align:center; style="background-color:#bfb"
| 114 || August 6 || @ Angels || 8–3 || Yu Darvish (11–5) || Kevin Jepsen (1–5) || Tanner Scheppers (1) || 64–50
|- style="text-align:center; style="background-color:#bfb"
| 115 || August 7 || @ Angels || 10–3 || Alexi Ogando (5–3) || Tommy Hanson (4–3) || None || 65–50
|- style="text-align:center; style="background-color:#bfb"
| 116 || August 9 || @ Astros || 9–5 || Matt Garza (8–2) || Josh Zeid (0–1) || Neal Cotts (1) || 66–50
|- style="text-align:center; style="background-color:#bfb"
| 117 || August 10 || @ Astros || 5–4 || Jason Frasor (3–2) || Lucas Harrell (5–13) || Joe Nathan (34) || 67–50
|- style="text-align:center; style="background-color:#bfb"
| 118 || August 11 || @ Astros || 6–1 || Martín Pérez (5–3) || Dallas Keuchel (5–7) || None || 68–50
|- style="text-align:center; style="background-color:#bfb"
| 119 || August 12 || @ Astros || 2–1 || Yu Darvish (12–5) || Brett Oberholtzer (2–1) || Joe Nathan (35) || 69–50
|- style="text-align:center; style="background-color:#fbb"
| 120 || August 13 || Brewers || 1–5 || Marco Estrada (5–4) || Alexi Ogando (5–4) || Jim Henderson (17) || 69–51
|- style="text-align:center; style="background-color:#bfb"
| 121 || August 14 || Brewers || 5–4 || Jason Frasor (4–2) || John Axford (5–6) || Joe Nathan (36) || 70–51
|- style="text-align:center; style="background-color:#fbb"
| 122 || August 16 || Mariners || 1–3 || Hisashi Iwakuma (11–6) || Neal Cotts (4–2) || Danny Farquhar (6) || 70–52
|- style="text-align:center; style="background-color:#bfb"
| 123 || August 17 || Mariners || 15–3 || Martín Pérez (6–3) || Félix Hernández (12–6) || None || 71–52
|- style="text-align:center; style="background-color:#fbb"
| 124 || August 18 || Mariners || 3–4 || Yoervis Medina (4–3) || Joe Nathan (3–2) || Danny Farquhar (7) || 71–53
|- style="text-align:center; style="background-color:#bfb"
| 125 || August 19 || Astros || 16–5 || Matt Garza (9–2) || Lucas Harrell (6–14) || None || 72–53
|- style="text-align:center; style="background-color:#bfb"
| 126 || August 20 || Astros || 4–2 || Neal Cotts (5–2) || Jarred Cosart (1–1) || Joe Nathan (37) || 73–53
|- style="text-align:center; style="background-color:#bfb"
| 127 || August 21 || Astros || 5–4 || Joe Nathan (4–2) || Chia-Jen Lo (0–1) || None || 74–53
|- style="text-align:center; style="background-color:#bfb"
| 128 || August 23 || @ White Sox || 11–5 || Martín Pérez (7–3) || Chris Sale (9–12) || None || 75–53
|- style="text-align:center; style="background-color:#fbb"
| 129 || August 24 || @ White Sox || 2–3 || Nate Jones (4–4) || Tanner Scheppers (5–2) || None || 75–54
|- style="text-align:center; style="background-color:#fbb"
| 130 || August 25 || @ White Sox || 2–5 || John Danks (4–10) || Matt Garza (9–3) || Addison Reed (35) || 75–55
|- style="text-align:center; style="background-color:#bfb"
| 131 || August 26 || @ Mariners || 8–3 || Travis Blackley (2–1) || Joe Saunders (10–13) || None || 76–55
|- style="text-align:center; style="background-color:#bfb"
| 132 || August 27 || @ Mariners || 4–3 (10) || Tanner Scheppers (6–2) || Danny Farquhar (0–2) || Joe Nathan (38) || 77–55
|- style="text-align:center; style="background-color:#bfb"
| 133 || August 28 || @ Mariners || 12–4 || Martín Pérez (8–3) || Félix Hernández (12–8) || None || 78–55
|- style="text-align:center; style="background-color:#fbb"
| 134 || August 30 || Twins || 2–3 || Liam Hendriks (1–2) || Yu Darvish (12–6) || Glen Perkins (31) || 78–56
|- style="text-align:center; style="background-color:#bfb"
| 135 || August 31 || Twins || 2–1 || Joe Nathan (5–2) || Caleb Thielbar (2–2) || None || 79–56
|-

|- style="text-align:center; style="background-color:#fbb"
| 136 || September 1 || Twins || 2–4 || Kevin Correia (9–10) || Travis Blackley (2–2) || Glen Perkins (32) || 79–57
|- style="text-align:center; style="background-color:#fbb"
| 137 || September 2 || @ Athletics || 2–4 || Dan Straily (8–7) || Derek Holland (9–7) || Grant Balfour (36) || 79–58
|- style="text-align:center; style="background-color:#bfb"
| 138 || September 3 || @ Athletics || 5–1 || Martín Pérez (9–3) || Bartolo Colón (14–6) || None || 80–58
|- style="text-align:center; style="background-color:#fbb"
| 139 || September 4 || @ Athletics || 4–11 || Jarrod Parker (11–6) || Yu Darvish (12–7) || Brett Anderson (2) || 80–59
|- style="text-align:center; style="background-color:#fbb"
| 140 || September 6 || @ Angels || 5–6 || C. J. Wilson (15–6) || Matt Garza (9–4) || Ernesto Frieri (31) || 80–60
|- style="text-align:center; style="background-color:#fbb"
| 141 || September 7 || @ Angels || 3–8 || Garrett Richards (6–6) || Derek Holland (9–8) || None || 80–61
|- style="text-align:center; style="background-color:#bfb"
| 142 || September 8 || @ Angels || 4–3 || Alexi Ogando (6–4) || Michael Kohn (1–2) || Joe Nathan (39) || 81–61
|- style="text-align:center; style="background-color:#fbb"
| 143 || September 9 || Pirates || 0–1 || Gerrit Cole (7–7) || Yu Darvish (12–8) || Mark Melancon (12) || 81–62
|- style="text-align:center; style="background-color:#fbb"
| 144 || September 10 || Pirates || 4–5 || Francisco Liriano (16–7) || Martín Pérez (9–4) || Mark Melancon (13) || 81–63
|- style="text-align:center; style="background-color:#fbb"
| 145 || September 11 || Pirates || 5–7 || A. J. Burnett (8–10) || Matt Garza (9–5) || Kyle Farnsworth (1) || 81–64
|- style="text-align:center; style="background-color:#fbb"
| 146 || September 13 || Athletics || 8–9 || Dan Straily (10–7) || Derek Holland (9–9) || Sean Doolittle (2) || 81–65
|- style="text-align:center; style="background-color:#fbb"
| 147 || September 14 || Athletics || 0–1 || Bartolo Colón (16–6) || Yu Darvish (12–9) || Grant Balfour (38) || 81–66
|- style="text-align:center; style="background-color:#fbb"
| 148 || September 15 || Athletics || 1–5 || Tommy Milone (11–9) || Martín Pérez (9–5) || None || 81–67
|- style="text-align:center; style="background-color:#fbb"
| 149 || September 16 || @ Rays || 2–6 || Alex Cobb (9–3) || Matt Garza (9–6) || None || 81–68
|- style="text-align:center; style="background-color:#bfb"
| 150 || September 17 || @ Rays || 7–1 || Alexi Ogando (7–4) || Jeremy Hellickson (11–9) || None || 82–68
|- style="text-align:center; style="background-color:#fbb"
| 151 || September 18 || @ Rays || 3–4 (12) || Brandon Gomes (2–1) || Joseph Ortiz (2–2) || None || 82–69
|- style="text-align:center; style="background-color:#bfb"
| 152 || September 19 || @ Rays || 8–2 || Yu Darvish (13–9) || Matt Moore (15–4) || None || 83–69
|- style="text-align:center; style="background-color:#fbb"
| 153 || September 20 || @ Royals || 1–2 || Luke Hochevar (5–2) || Jason Frasor (4–3) || Greg Holland (44) || 83–70
|- style="text-align:center; style="background-color:#bfb"
| 154 || September 21 || @ Royals || 3–1 || Matt Garza (10–6) || Jeremy Guthrie (14–12) || Joe Nathan (40) || 84–70
|- style="text-align:center; style="background-color:#fbb"
| 155 || September 22 || @ Royals || 0–4 (10) || Tim Collins (3–6) || Neal Cotts (5–3) || None || 84–71
|- style="text-align:center; style="background-color:#bfb"
| 156 || September 23 || Astros || 12–0 || Derek Holland (10–9) || Jordan Lyles (7–9) || None || 85–71
|- style="text-align:center; style="background-color:#bfb"
| 157 || September 24 || Astros || 3–2 || Neal Cotts (6–3) || Brad Peacock (5–6) || Joe Nathan (41) || 86–71
|- style="text-align:center; style="background-color:#bfb"
| 158 || September 25 || Astros || 7–3 || Martín Pérez (10–5) || Dallas Keuchel (6–10) || None || 87–71
|- style="text-align:center; style="background-color:#bfb"
| 159 || September 26 || Angels || 6–5 || Joe Nathan (6–2) || Michael Kohn (1–4) || None || 88–71
|- style="text-align:center; style="background-color:#bfb"
| 160 || September 27 || Angels || 5–3 || Neal Cotts (7–3) || Juan Gutiérrez (1–5) || Joe Nathan (42) || 89–71
|- style="text-align:center; style="background-color:#bfb"
| 161 || September 28 || Angels || 7–4 || Joakim Soria (1–0) || Garrett Richards (7–8) || Joe Nathan (43) || 90–71
|- style="text-align:center; style="background-color:#bfb"
| 162 || September 29 || Angels || 6–2 || Neal Cotts (8–3) || Jason Vargas (9–8) || None || 91–71
|- style="text-align:center; style="background-color:#fbb"
| 163 || September 30 || Rays || 2–5 || David Price (10–8) || Martín Pérez (10–6) || None || 91–72
|-

Roster

Farm system

References

External links

2013 Texas Rangers Official Site 
2013 Texas Rangers at ESPN
2013 Texas Rangers at Baseball Reference

Texas Rangers seasons
Texas Rangers
Rangers